Dragan Zorić (born 20 May 1979, in Bačka Palanka) is a Serbian sprint canoer who has competed from the late 1990s to 2007. Until 2006, he competed for Serbia and Montenegro. Zorić won five medals at the ICF Canoe Sprint World Championships with two golds (K-2 200 m: 2005, K-4 200 m: 2006), a silver (K-4 200 m: 2007, and two bronzes (K-2 200 m: 2006, 2007).

Competing in two Summer Olympics, his best finish was ninth in the K-4 1000 m event at Sydney in 2000.

Zorić is a member of the Sintelon Canoe Club in Bačka Palanka. He is 196 cm (6'5") tall and weighs 97 kg (214 lbs).

References

1979 births
People from Bačka Palanka
Canoeists at the 2000 Summer Olympics
Canoeists at the 2004 Summer Olympics
Living people
Olympic canoeists of Serbia and Montenegro
Serbia and Montenegro male canoeists
Serbian male canoeists
Yugoslav male canoeists
ICF Canoe Sprint World Championships medalists in kayak
European champions for Serbia

Mediterranean Games bronze medalists for Serbia
Competitors at the 2005 Mediterranean Games
Mediterranean Games medalists in canoeing